Sami "Helge" Helenius (born January 22, 1974) is a Finnish former professional ice hockey defenceman who played predominantly in the SM-liiga and National Hockey League. He most recently was in a coaching role with Haukat of the Suomi-sarja.

Playing career
Helenius was drafted by the Calgary Flames as their fifth-round pick, 102nd overall, in the 1992 NHL Entry Draft. He started his professional career in Jokerit in the Finnish SM-liiga in 1992, and made his way to North America for the 1994–95 season, and after spending five years mostly in the minor leagues, Helenius took his place as an NHL defenceman, playing for several teams. Helenius became known as the "Fighting Finn," as he was one of the few Europeans to play in an enforcer role in North-American hockey leagues.

In 2003, he returned to Finland to play in the SM-liiga again. After a year with Jokerit where he served as team captain, Helenius represented both Ilves and Pelicans before returning to Jokerit after the 2006–07 season.

After three seasons with Jokerit and during the 2009–10 season, Helenius rejoined previous club Pelicans on November 13, 2009. After finishing the season out with Pelicans, Helenius agreed to join HC Keski-Uusimaa of the Suomi-sarja as a player-coach for the 2010–11 season on August 4, 2010, however only opted to coach upon the resumption of the season.

Coaching career
In the summer of 2022, Helenius signed a 1+1 year contract with the Kouvola KooKoo.

- I look forward to new challenges at KooKoo! I’ve been watching the Liiga for a couple of years up close and I'm aware of the demands and currents of modern hockey, but I want to bring those good “old school” elements to the game as well, Helenius says.

Career statistics

Regular season and playoffs

International

References

External links

1974 births
Calgary Flames draft picks
Calgary Flames players
Chicago Blackhawks players
Chicago Wolves (IHL) players
Colorado Avalanche players
Dallas Stars players
Finnish ice hockey defencemen
Hershey Bears players
Ilves players
Jokerit players
Las Vegas Thunder players
Living people
Lahti Pelicans players
Ice hockey people from Helsinki
Saint John Flames players
Tampa Bay Lightning players
Utah Grizzlies (AHL) players